Spiral Circle -Complete- is an album released by Unsraw on January 24, 2007. It contains the songs from the previously released EP Spiral Circle, and 3 additional songs. The European edition includes a DVD containing two studio music videos, and two live footage compilation videos.

Track listing
Disc one (CD)
"End of Finale (Introduction)" - 2:43
"Dust to Dust (New Recording)" - 3:06
"-9-" - 3:25
"Maria (New Recording)" - 2:31
"In the Fact" - 4:03
"Kyuumin -Oyasumi- (New Recording)" (休眠-おやすみ- ) - 6:01
"Karma" - 4:30
"[Rew]" - 3:52
"Gate of Death" - 5:16
"Warai Oni" (嗤い鬼) - 2:40

Disc two (DVD, European edition only)
"-9-"
"Gate of Death"
"Karma"
"Warai Oni" (嗤い鬼)

Notes
"Dust to Dust" is a re-recording of a song released to Shoxx magazine subscribers as a promotional single.
"Maria" and "Kyuumin -Oyasumi-" are both covers of songs by Core the Child, the former band of Yuuki and Shou. "Maria" was also covered for the compilation CD Graceful Playboys (2006).
The DVD supplementing the European edition contains the videos that came with both versions of the Spiral Circle EP (2006).

Personnel
Yuuki – vocals
Rai – guitar
Tetsu – guitar
Jun – bass guitar
Shou – drums
Fumihiko Sano – recording
"T-Pop" Matsushita – executive producer

2007 albums
Unsraw albums